Granulomelon grandituberculatum is a species of air-breathing land snails, terrestrial pulmonate gastropod mollusks in the family Camaenidae. This species is endemic to Australia.

References

Gastropods of Australia
Grandituberculatum
Taxonomy articles created by Polbot